Pinarnegrillo is a municipality located in the province of Segovia, Castile and León, Spain. 
According to the 2004 census (INE), the municipality had a population of 162 inhabitants. In 2018 it had fallen to 100.

The village is famous for its tomatoes plantation.

References

Municipalities in the Province of Segovia